Hogness is a surname. Notable people with the surname include:

David Hogness (1925–2019), American biochemist
Hanne Hogness (born 1967), Norwegian handball player
Thorfin R. Hogness (1894–1976), American physical chemist

See also
Holness